John Barnes (July 26, 1859January 1, 1919) was an American attorney and judge from Wisconsin. He was a justice of the Wisconsin Supreme Court from 1908 until 1916, and was one of the first Wisconsin Railroad Commissioners. He worked as general counsel for the Northwestern Mutual Life Insurance Company from 1916 until his death.

Early life and education

Born in 1859, on a farm in Manitowoc County, Wisconsin, Barnes was the son of Irish American immigrants who had arrived in the Wisconsin from Canada in 1858. Barnes graduated from Manitowoc High School in 1876 and attended the Oshkosh Normal School, after which he taught school for six years. He graduated from the University of Wisconsin Law School in 1885 and began practicing law in Oshkosh.

Career 
In 1887, Barnes relocated to Rhinelander, and became the first municipal judge of Oneida County, served as president of the local school board, and prospered in business. Barnes was a Democrat.

In 1905, he was appointed to the newly created Wisconsin Railroad Commission by Governor Robert M. La Follette. In 1908, he was elected to the Wisconsin Supreme Court in a special election after the death of Chief Justice John B. Cassoday. He defeated appointed justice Robert McKee Bashford, and went on to re-election to a full term in 1909. In 1916, however, Barnes resigned to become general counsel of the Northwestern Mutual Life Insurance Company.

Personal life
Judge Barnes married Julia Koelzer, a childhood friend, in 1887. They had four children together. He was a Catholic and a member of the Knights of Columbus.

Barnes suffered a stroke at his office in Milwaukee on December 28, 1918, and died four days later, after developing pneumonia.

Electoral history

| colspan="6" style="text-align:center;background-color: #e9e9e9;"| General Election, April 7, 1908

References

External links
 

People from Manitowoc County, Wisconsin
People from Rhinelander, Wisconsin
University of Wisconsin–Oshkosh alumni
University of Wisconsin Law School alumni
Wisconsin Democrats
Wisconsin lawyers
Justices of the Wisconsin Supreme Court
1859 births
1919 deaths
People from Manitowoc, Wisconsin
19th-century American judges
19th-century American lawyers